Karl Andersson is a Swedish sprint canoeist who competed in the early 1950s. He won a gold medal in the K-4 10000 m event at the 1950 ICF Canoe Sprint World Championships in Copenhagen.

References

Possibly living people
Year of birth missing
Swedish male canoeists
ICF Canoe Sprint World Championships medalists in kayak